3rd Class is a 2020 Kannada, romantic action film directed by Ashok Dev and produced by Nam Jagadeesh under the banner of 7Hills Studio. The film starring Nam Jagadeesh, Roopika and Divya Rao, revolves around Sahana (Roopika) and Jagadeesh (Jaggi), who hails from the different socio-economic background. Sahana is a daughter of a home minister, while Jaggi is a mechanic. It is the story of their relationship and how they deal with this difference. The film was released on 7 February 2020.

Cast 
 Nam Jagadeesh as Jagadeesh 
 Roopika as Sahana
 Divya Rao
 Avinash as Home Minister
 Sangeetha
 Pawan Kumar
 Harish Venkateshan
 Nippu
 Sai Gold Saravanan
 Ramesh Bhat

Production 
The film has been shot in Bangalore, Kerala and Goa. The film crew decided to help poor auto drivers and blind people instead of spending the money on banners as part of promoting their film.

Release

The film was theatrically released on 7 February 2020.

Soundtrack 

Jessie Gift composed music for this film, and lyrics are penned by Dr. V. Nagendra Prasad, Kaviraj and Chethan. The soundtrack of the film was launched by blind students, orphan students and retired army soldiers. The team have distributed insurance bonds to 200 students worth of Rs. 2,50,000/-.

Reception 
A critic called the film's story "power-packed". Another critic gave the film a negative review.

References

External links
 

2020s Kannada-language films
2020 films
Films shot in Karnataka
Indian romantic action films
Films shot in Goa
2020 romance films
2020 action films
2020s romantic action films